Orlando Lanza (2 January 1932 – 10 December 1999) was a Cuban rower. He competed in the men's coxless four event at the 1956 Summer Olympics.

References

External links
 

1932 births
1999 deaths
Cuban male rowers
Olympic rowers of Cuba
Rowers at the 1956 Summer Olympics
Place of birth missing